This is a list of 78 federal electoral districts in the province of Quebec.

Quebec City Area

Capitale-Nationale
 Beauport—Limoilou
 Beauport—Côte-de-Beaupré—Île d'Orléans—Charlevoix
 Charlesbourg—Haute-Saint-Charles
 Louis-Hébert
 Louis-Saint-Laurent
 Portneuf—Jacques-Cartier 
 Québec

Chaudière-Appalaches
 Beauce
 Bellechasse—Les Etchemins—Lévis
 Lévis—Lotbinière

The Eastern Townships

Centre-du-Québec
 Bécancour—Nicolet—Saurel
 Drummond
 Mégantic—L'Érable

Estrie
 Compton—Stanstead
 Richmond—Arthabaska
 Sherbrooke

Montérégie Est
 Brome—Missisquoi
 Saint-Hyacinthe—Bagot
 Shefford

Central Quebec

Lanaudière
 Joliette
 Montcalm
 Repentigny
 Terrebonne

Mauricie
 Berthier—Maskinongé
 Saint-Maurice—Champlain
 Trois-Rivières

Côte-Nord and Saguenay

Saguenay–Lac-Saint-Jean
 Chicoutimi—Le Fjord
 Jonquière
 Lac-Saint-Jean

Côte-Nord
 Manicouagan

Eastern Quebec

Bas-Saint-Laurent
 Avignon—La Mitis—Matane—Matapédia
 Montmagny—L'Islet—Kamouraska—Rivière-du-Loup
 Rimouski-Neigette—Témiscouata—Les Basques

Gaspésie–Îles-de-la-Madeleine
 Gaspésie—Les Îles-de-la-Madeleine

The Laurentides, Outaouais and Northern Quebec

Laurentides 
 Laurentides—Labelle
 Mirabel
 Rivière-des-Mille-Îles
 Rivière-du-Nord
 Thérèse-De Blainville

Outaouais
 Argenteuil—La Petite-Nation
 Gatineau
 Hull—Aylmer
 Pontiac

Northern Quebec (Nord-du-Québec and Abitibi-Témiscamingue)
 Abitibi—Baie-James—Nunavik—Eeyou
 Abitibi—Témiscamingue

Montreal (East, West, North & Laval)

Laval
 Alfred-Pellan
 Laval—Les Îles
 Marc-Aurèle-Fortin
 Vimy

Montreal 
 Ahuntsic-Cartierville
 Bourassa
 Dorval—Lachine—LaSalle
 Hochelaga
 Honoré-Mercier
 Lac-Saint-Louis
 LaSalle—Émard—Verdun
 Laurier—Sainte-Marie
 Mount Royal
 Notre-Dame-de-Grâce—Westmount
 Outremont
 Papineau
 Pierrefonds—Dollard
 La Pointe-de-l'Île
 Rosemont—La Petite-Patrie
 Saint-Laurent
 Saint-Léonard—Saint-Michel
 Ville-Marie—Le Sud-Ouest—Île-des-Sœurs

Montérégie
 Beloeil—Chambly
 Brossard—Saint-Lambert
 Châteauguay—Lacolle
 Longueuil—Charles-LeMoyne
 Longueuil—Saint-Hubert
 Montarville
 Pierre-Boucher—Les Patriotes—Verchères
 La Prairie
 Saint-Jean
 Salaberry—Suroît
 Vaudreuil—Soulanges

Quebec
Federal electoral districts